Efva Katarina Attling, (born on 18 February 1952) is a Swedish silversmith and jewellery designer.

Early career 
In the early 1980s she played in the band "X Models" and released the hit single Två av oss ("Two of us").

She worked as a professional model for twelve years after being spotted by Eileen Ford.  She was also noted for being one of Sweden's best professional disco dancers.

Silversmith and jewellery designer 
Attling designed for Levi's and H&M and in the mid-1990s she started her own line of jewellery. Her pendant "Homo Sapiens" was worn by Madonna in 1999, and Meryl Streep is also known to wear her jewellery.

She has stores in Sweden, Norway, Finland and New York. The estimated turnover for her company was SEK 100 million in 2011.

Personal life 
Attling was married to pop singer/writer Niklas Strömstedt, with whom she has two children, from 1985 to 1995. She entered a civil union with Swedish pop singer Eva Dahlgren in 1996. They were married in 2009 after Sweden passed its gender neutral marriage law.

Awards 
Attling has received a medal from the Royal Swedish Patriotic Society in April 2011 for distinguishing herself as an internationally known jewellery designer.

References

External links 

1952 births
Lesbian singers
LGBT fashion designers
Lesbian models
Swedish lesbian musicians
Swedish lesbian artists
Swedish LGBT singers
Living people
Swedish fashion designers
Swedish jewelry designers
Swedish female models
Swedish pop singers
20th-century Swedish women singers
21st-century Swedish women singers
Swedish silversmiths
Women metalsmiths
Swedish women artisans
Swedish women fashion designers
20th-century Swedish LGBT people
21st-century Swedish LGBT people